Simoselaps bertholdi, also known commonly as Jan's banded snake or the southern desert banded snake, is a species of burrowing venomous snake in the family Elapidae. The species is endemic to Australia.

Etymology
The specific epithet bertholdi honours German physician and naturalist Arnold Adolph Berthold.

Description

Reproduction
S. bertholdi is oviparous, with an average clutch size of four.

Distribution and habitat
The geographic range of S. bertholdi covers a broad swathe of arid inland Australia from central and western South Australia and the south-west of the Northern Territory, westwards across Western Australia to the western coast of the continent.

References

Further reading
Boulenger GA (1896). Catalogue of the Snakes in the British Museum (Natural History). Volume III., Containing the Colubridæ (Opisthoglyphæ and Proteroglyphæ) .... London: Trustees of the British Museum (Natural History). (Taylor and Francis, printers). xiv + 727 pp. + Plates I–XXV. (Rhynchelaps bertholdi, pp. 362–363).
Cogger HG (2014). Reptiles and Amphibians of Australia, Seventh Edition. Clayton, Victoria, Australia: CSIRO Publishing. xxx + 1,033 pp. .
Jan [G] (1859). "Plan d'une Iconographie descriptive des Ophidiens et Description sommaire de nouvelles espèces de Serpents ". Revue et Magasin de Zoologie Pure et Appliquée, Paris, Series 2, 11: 122–130. (Elaps bertholdi, new species, p. 123). (in French).
Wilson S, Swan G (2013). A Complete Guide to Reptiles of Australia, Fourth Edition. Sydney: New Holland Publishers. 522 pp. .

 
bertholdi
Snakes of Australia
Endemic fauna of Australia
Reptiles of the Northern Territory
Reptiles of South Australia
Reptiles of Western Australia
Taxa named by Giorgio Jan
Reptiles described in 1859